Jupiter Creek (postcode 5153) is a semi-rural suburb of Adelaide, South Australia. It lies within the District Council of Mount Barker, west of Echunga.

Gold Diggings 
It is part of the former goldmining area the Battunga Country. 
Jupiter Creek was the site of a gold discovery in the mid-1800s, there still exists a fossicking reserve in the old diggings with an interpretive walking trail.

References

Suburbs of Adelaide
Adelaide Hills
Mining towns in South Australia